Dominican Americans, also known as Dominiquais Americans, are Americans who have full or partial ancestry from the island of Dominica.

Notable people

 Aldis Hodge
 Edwin Hodge
 Erison Hurtault
 Maurice DuBois
 Tobi Jnohope
 Nathalie Emmanuel
 Adolph Caesar
 Rosetta LeNoire
 Wyatt Bardouille

References

See also 
 Dominica–United States relations

 
Dominica diaspora
Caribbean American